Deh-e Rostam may refer to:
 Deh-e Rostam, Kerman
 Deh-e Rostam, Sistan and Baluchestan
 Deh-e Rostam, Hirmand, Sistan and Baluchestan Province